The International Cycling History Conference (ICHC) is an annual event devoted to applying academic rigor to the history of bicycles and cycling. The first conference was held in Glasgow, Scotland in 1990. The proceedings of each conference are published afterwards.

Past conferences have been held around the world:

Notable presenters include:
Berto, Frank, author of  The Dancing Chain and The Birth of Dirt, both published by Cycle Publishing/Van der Plas Publications
Breeze, Joe, mountain bike pioneer and Mountain Bike Hall of Fame inductee
Herlihy, David V., author of Bicycle: the History, published by Yale University Press
Norcliffe, Glen, author of The Ride to Modernity: The Bicycle in Canada, published by University of Toronto Press
Ritchie, Andrew, author of Major Taylor: The Fastest Bicycle Rider in the World and Quest for Speed: A History of Early Bicycle Racing 1868–1903, both published by Van der Plas Publications (not the inventor of the Brompton Bicycle)
Wilson, David Gordon, author of Bicycling Science, published by The MIT Press

Invention of the bicycle
At the fourth conference, in Boston, Massachusetts, Oct. 11-16, 1993, David V. Herlihy presented evidence that Pierre Lallement deserves credit for putting pedals on the dandy horse instead of Pierre Michaux.

At the eighth conference in Glasgow, the German professor Hans-Erhard Lessing reported that the famous drawing of a bicycle attributed to Leonardo da Vinci was a hoax.

References

External links
International Cycling History Conference official web site

International Cycling History Conference
Cycling conferences
History of transport